Anish Shroff (born 1982) is the radio play-by-play man for the Carolina Panthers and play-by-play announcer and on-air host at ESPN

Early life and education
Shroff was born in Bloomfield, New Jersey, to Indian parents who are both from Mumbai. His father is a professional photographer.

Shroff graduated from Bloomfield High School in 2000, and went on to earn a bachelor's degree in broadcast journalism from the S. I. Newhouse School of Public Communications at Syracuse University.

Career
He was featured on the second season of ESPN reality show Dream Job in 2004, in which he was one of the three finalists. Following his stint on Dream Job, Shroff worked as an anchor, talk show host and play-by-play announcer at WHEN Radio in Syracuse, New York. He was later a freelance anchor at CSTV (now CBS Sports Network) in New York City and then served as sports director at KNDO-TV in Yakima, Washington.

He joined ESPN on January 1, 2008, initially at ESPNews. While at ESPN, he called college baseball, football, basketball and lacrosse, and hosted various shows on ESPN and ESPNU. In March 2022, he was named the third play-by-play announcer in Panthers history following Mick Mixon's retirement.

References

Living people
American television sports anchors
Bloomfield High School (New Jersey) alumni
People from Bloomfield, New Jersey
S.I. Newhouse School of Public Communications alumni
College basketball announcers in the United States
College football announcers
College baseball announcers in the United States
Lacrosse announcers
American people of Indian descent
1982 births